Miroslav Danov (born 30 September 1979) is a Bulgarian bobsledder. He competed in the two man event at the 2002 Winter Olympics.

References

1979 births
Living people
Bulgarian male bobsledders
Olympic bobsledders of Bulgaria
Bobsledders at the 2002 Winter Olympics
People from Vratsa